Počenik is a settlement in the Municipality of Pesnica in northeastern Slovenia. It lies in the Slovene Hills and was traditionally part of the Styria region. The municipality is now included in the Drava Statistical Region.

References

External links
Počenik on Geopedia

Populated places in the Municipality of Pesnica